Eiderdown can refer to:
 The down feathers of the eider duck
 Eiderdown (bedding), a duvet or comforter (a kind of quilt), traditionally containing eider duck down